The CONCACAF Gold Cup is North America's major tournament in senior men's football and determines the continental champion. Until 1989, the tournament was known as CONCACAF Championship. It is currently held every two years. From 1996 to 2005, nations from other confederations have regularly joined the tournament as invitees. In earlier editions, the continental championship was held in different countries, but since the inception of the Gold Cup in 1991, the United States are constant hosts or co-hosts.

From 1973 to 1989, the tournament doubled as the confederation's World Cup qualification. CONCACAF's representative team at the FIFA Confederations Cup was decided by a play-off between the winners of the last two tournament editions in 2015 via the CONCACAF Cup, but was then discontinued along with the Confederations Cup.

Since 1963, the Gold Cup was held 26 times and has been won by seven different nations, most often by Mexico (11 titles).

El Salvador hosted the inaugural CONCACAF Championship in 1963. In the final round, they started with two victories, but lost the final and decisive match against Costa Rica 1–4. In that tournament, Salvadoran striker Volkswagen Hernández was top striker with five goals.

Since then, El Salvador have finished as runners-up again in 1981, and earned third place in 1977. After sixteen total appearances, El Salvador ranks 7th in the tournament's all-time table.

Overall record

Match overview

Record by opponent

References

Countries at the CONCACAF Gold Cup
El Salvador national football team